Antonio Cavalli (12 September 1889 – 20 December 1965) was an Italian politician who served as Mayor of Bergamo (1945–1946), member of the Constituent Assembly (1946–1948) and Deputy for two legislatures (1948–1958).

References

1889 births
1965 deaths
Mayors of Bergamo
Deputies of Legislature I of Italy
Deputies of Legislature II of Italy
Members of the Constituent Assembly of Italy
Christian Democracy (Italy) politicians